William John Locke (20 March 1863 – 15 May 1930) was a British novelist, dramatist and playwright, best known for his short stories.

Biography
He was born in Cunningsbury St George, Christ Church, Demerara, British Guiana on 20 March 1863, the eldest son of John Locke, bank manager of Barbados, and his first wife, Sarah Elizabeth Locke (née Johns). His parents were English. In 1864 his family moved to Trinidad and Tobago. In 1865, a second son was born, Charlie Alfred Locke, who was eventually to become a doctor. Charlie Locke died in 1904 aged 39. His half-sister, Anna Alexandra Hyde (née Locke), by his father's second marriage, died in 1898 in childbirth aged 25.

At the age of three, Locke was sent to England for further education. He remained in England for nine years, before returning to Trinidad to attend prep school with his brother at Queen's Royal College. There, he won an exhibition to enter St John's College, Cambridge. He returned to England in 1881 to attend Cambridge University, where he graduated with honours in Mathematics in 1884, despite his dislike of that "utterly futile and inhuman subject".

After leaving Cambridge, Locke became a schoolmaster. He disliked teaching, but is known to have been a master at the Oxford Military College at Temple Cowley, in 1889 and 1890, and at Clifton College, Bristol in 1890; from 1891 to 1897 he was modern languages master at Trinity College, Glenalmond. In 1893 he published a school edition of Murat, an extract from the Celebrated Crimes (Les crimes célèbres) of Alexandre Dumas père. In 1890 he became seriously ill with tuberculosis, which affected him for the rest of his life. From 1897 to 1907 he was secretary of the Royal Institute of British Architects and lived in London.

In 1894 he published his first novel, At the Gate of Samaria, but he did not achieve real success for another decade, with The Morals of Marcus Ordeyne (1905) and The Beloved Vagabond (1906). Chambers Biographical Dictionary wrote of his "long series of novels and plays which with their charmingly written sentimental themes had such a success during his life in both Britain and America.... His plays, some of which were dramatised versions of his novels, were all produced with success on the London Stage" (p. 836).

On 19 May 1911, Locke married Aimee Maxwell Close (née Heath), the divorced wife of Percy Hamilton Close, in Chelsea in London. The wedding was attended by Alice Baines and James Douglas.

Five times Locke's books made the list of best-selling novels in the United States for the year. His works have been made into 24 motion pictures the most recent of which was Ladies in Lavender, filmed in 2004 and starring Dame Judi Dench and Maggie Smith. Adapted to the screen by Charles Dance, it was based on Locke's 1916 short story of the same title that had been published in a collection entitled "Faraway Stories." Probably the most famous of Locke's books adapted to the screen was the 1918 production of Stella Maris starring Mary Pickford. In addition, four of his books were made into Broadway plays, two of which Locke wrote and were produced by Charles Frohman.

Locke died of cancer at 67 , Paris, France, on 15 May 1930.

Bibliography

Books

At the Gate of Samaria (1894)
The Demagogue and Lady Phayre (1895)
Some Women and a Man; A Comedy of Contrasts (1896)
Derelicts (1897)
The White Dove (1900)
The Usurper (1901)
Where Love Is (1903)
The Morals of Marcus Ordeyne (1905)
The Beloved Vagabond  (1906)
A Study in Shadows (1908)
Septimus (1909) No. 10 for 1909 in the U.S.
A Christmas Mystery – The Story of Three Wise Men (1910)
Viviette (1910)
Simon the Jester  (1910) No. 6 for 1910 in the U.S.
The Glory of Clementina Wing The Glory of Clementina Wing (1911)
Idols (1911)
The Joyous Adventures of Aristide Pujol (1912)
Stella Maris  (1913)
The Fortunate Youth  (1914) No. 5 for 1914 in the U.S.
The William J. Locke Calendar (1914) Compiled by Emma M. Pope
Jaffery (1915) No. 6 for 1915 in the U.S.

Faraway Stories  (1916) (short story collection)
The Wonderful Year  (1916)
The Red Planet  (1917) No. 3 for 1917 in the U.S.
The Rough Road  (1918)
The Mountebank (1920. Serialised in Nash's & Pall Mall magazine February 1920)
The House of Baltazar  (1920)
The Apostle  (1921)
The Tale of Triona  (1922)
The Lengthened Shadow  (1923)
Moordius & Co  (1923)
The Golden Journey of Mr. Paradyne  (1924)
The Coming of Amos (1924)
The Great Pandolfo (1925)
Perella (1926)
The Old Bridge (1926)
Stories Near and Far  (1927)
The Kingdom of Theophilus  (1927)
Joshua's Vision  (1928)
Ancestor Jorico (1929)
The Town of Tombarel  (1930)
The Shorn Lamb  (1930)

Short stories

Film adaptations
The Morals of Marcus, directed by Edwin S. Porter and Hugh Ford (1915, based on the novel The Morals of Marcus Ordeyne)
, directed by Ashley Miller (1915, based on the novel The Glory of Clementina Wing)
Simon the Jester, directed by Edward José (1915, based on the novel Simon the Jester)
The Beloved Vagabond, directed by Edward José (1915, based on the novel The Beloved Vagabond)
The Fortunate Youth, directed by Joseph W. Smiley (1916, based on the novel The Fortunate Youth)
Idols, directed by Webster Cullison (1916, based on the novel Idols)
, directed by George Irving (1916, based on the novel Jaffery)
Where Love Is (1917, based on the novel Where Love Is)
Derelicts, directed by Sidney Morgan (UK, 1917, based on the novel Derelicts)
Stella Maris, directed by Marshall Neilan (1918, based on the novel Stella Maris)
Viviette, directed by Walter Edwards (1918, based on the novel Viviette)
The Usurper, directed by Duncan McRae (1919, based on the novel The Usurper)
The White Dove, directed by Henry King (1920, based on the novel The White Dove)
The Joyous Adventures of Aristide Pujol, directed by Frank Miller (UK, 1920, based on the book The Joyous Adventures of Aristide Pujol)
The Song of the Soul, directed by John W. Noble (1920, based on the story "An Old-World Episode")
The Oath, directed by Raoul Walsh (1921, based on the novel Idols)
The Wonderful Year, directed by Kenelm Foss (UK, 1921, based on the novel The Wonderful Year)
Morals, directed by William Desmond Taylor (1921, based on the novel The Morals of Marcus Ordeyne)
, directed by Émile Chautard (1922, based on the novel The Glory of Clementina Wing)
The Beloved Vagabond, directed by Fred LeRoy Granville (UK, 1923, based on the novel The Beloved Vagabond)
A Fool's Awakening, directed by Harold M. Shaw (1924, based on the novel The Tale of Triona)
The Side Show of Life, directed by Herbert Brenon (1924, based on the novel The Mountebank)
The Coming of Amos, directed by Paul Sloane (1925, based on the novel The Coming of Amos)
Simon the Jester, directed by George Melford (1925, based on the novel Simon the Jester)
Stella Maris, directed by Charles Brabin (1925, based on the novel Stella Maris)
Strangers in Love, directed by Lothar Mendes (1932, based on the novel The Shorn Lamb)
The Morals of Marcus, directed by Miles Mander (UK, 1935, based on the novel The Morals of Marcus Ordeyne)
The Beloved Vagabond, directed by Curtis Bernhardt (UK, 1936, based on the novel The Beloved Vagabond)
, directed by Homero Cárpena (Argentina, 1953, based on the novel Stella Maris)
Ladies in Lavender, directed by Charles Dance (UK, 2004, based on the story "Ladies in Lavender")

References

 Campbell, C. C., The Young Colonials: A Social History of Education in Trinidad and Tobago 1834 – 1939, The Press of the University of the West Indies (1996).
 Chambers Biographical Dictionary (rev. edn 1984)
 D. C. Browning (ed.), Everyman's Dictionary of Literary Biography English & American (1958)
 "E. O'Brien", Locke, William John (1863–1930), rev. Charlotte Mitchell, Oxford Dictionary of National Biography, Oxford University Press (2004).
 Tibbetts, J. C. "Mary Pickford and the American 'Growing Girl'" (2001), Journal of Popular Film and Television, Volume 29, No. 2, Routledge (2001).
 The William J. Locke Calendar (1914). Compiled by Emma M. Pope – Reference from the British Library (www.bl.uk)

External links
 William John Locke Papers at the Harry Ransom Center
 
 
 
 
 
 
 

1863 births
1930 deaths
20th-century British novelists
British short story writers
British dramatists and playwrights
Alumni of St John's College, Cambridge
Guyanese emigrants to the United Kingdom
British male novelists
British male dramatists and playwrights
British male short story writers
Alumni of Queen's Royal College, Trinidad
20th-century British short story writers
20th-century British male writers